Tyler Spencer (born January 22, 1972), also known as Dick Valentine, is an American singer, songwriter, musician, and author. He is best known as the lead vocalist, main lyricist, and co-founder of the rock band Electric Six.

Career
Spencer founded Electric Six in 1996, at which time the band was named the Wildbunch, but this was changed because another band had the same name. He is also one of the two members of the dance group Evil Cowards, is one of the vocalists for hard rock band Bang Camaro, and was temporarily a member of the short-lived band The Dirty Shame. He released his first solo album, Destroy the Children, under the Dick Valentine pseudonym on May 14, 2012.

Discography

Electric Six

The Dirty Shame
 Smog Cutter Love Story (2000)

Evil Cowards
 Covered in Gas (2009)
 Moving Through Security (2012)

Solo

Bite Me
Excluding appearances on other artists' songs, Dick Valentine's first solo venture was the soundtrack for Machinima original series Bite Me. Valentine's Evil Cowards bandmate, William Bates, scored the series, while Valentine wrote and performed a variety of original songs. Despite repeated claims that the songs would be made commercially available, Machinima are still yet to release any of them.

On September 11, 2011, Machinima released a music video for Valentine's song "Zombie, Zombie Skeleton" to promote the release of Dead Rising 2.

On June 14, 2012, Dick Valentine collaborated with Mighty Tiny to create The Dick Valentine Band. They performed a live show of the Bite Me soundtrack.

Albums

Singles and Appearances

Bibliography

Filmography

References

External links

1972 births
Living people
American rock singers
Songwriters from Michigan
Singers from Detroit
21st-century American singers
21st-century American male singers
American male songwriters